Michał Franciszek Mieczysław Matyas  (28 September 1910 – 22 October 1975) was a Polish footballer, who represented such teams as Pogoń Lwów and Polonia Bytom, as well as Poland. Among fans in Poland he was known as Myszka and in the Soviet Union he played under name of Mikhail. His real occupation was a petroleum technician.

Career
Matyas was born in Brzozów. After moving to Lwów in 1924 he started playing in junior team of Lechia and in 1926 moved to Pogoń, for which Matyas played for 14 seasons. His debut in the national team took place on 10 July 1932 in Warsaw in a 2–0 win against Sweden 2–0). All together he played in 18 international games (including the 1936 Summer Olympics in Berlin), scoring 7 goals. In Pogoń, in 1935 he was the top-scorer of the Polish Football League, with 22 goals.

During the World War II in 1939–40 Matyas played in Soviet competitions for Naftovyk Boryslav and for short while for FC Dynamo Kiev in 1941. Soon after the Nazi invasion of the Soviet Union, he returned to Lwow where he played for some local city teams in 1942–44. Following the war, Lwów was secured after the Soviet Union (as part of Soviet Ukraine), together with a group of Pogon's players and activists, he settled in Bytom, where he played for Polonia Bytom in 1945–48. After finishing his career, he became a coach, in 1950-1952 he was in charge of the national team of Poland. Later, he coached such teams as Stal Mielec and Cracovia. He died on 22 October 1975 in Kraków.

Honours
Pogoń Lwów
 Ekstraklasa runner-up: 1935

Lwów city team
 President of Poland Bowl: 1938

References

1910 births
1975 deaths
People from Brzozów County
People from the Kingdom of Galicia and Lodomeria
Sportspeople from Podkarpackie Voivodeship
Polish Austro-Hungarians
Polish footballers
Association football forwards
Polonia Bytom players
Pogoń Lwów players
FC Dynamo Kyiv players
Ekstraklasa players
Olympic footballers of Poland
Poland international footballers
Footballers at the 1936 Summer Olympics
Polish expatriate footballers
Polish expatriate sportspeople in the Soviet Union
Expatriate footballers in the Soviet Union
Polish football managers
Warta Poznań managers
Stal Mielec managers
MKS Cracovia managers
Polonia Bytom managers
Poland national football team managers
Wisła Kraków managers
Górnik Zabrze managers
Pogoń Szczecin managers
Soviet Top League players